Thomas Mashiane (born 31 May 1996) is a South African cricketer. He made his List A debut for Northerns in the 2018–19 CSA Provincial One-Day Challenge on 17 March 2019. He made his Twenty20 debut for Mpumalanga in the 2019–20 CSA Provincial T20 Cup on 13 September 2019.

References

External links
 

1996 births
Living people
South African cricketers
Mpumalanga cricketers
Northerns cricketers
Place of birth missing (living people)